Bodily Harm may refer to:

Bodily harm, legal jargon used in the definition of both statutory and common law offences
Bodily Harm (novel), a 1981 novel by Margaret Atwood 
Bodily Harm (film), a 1995 film by James Lemmo
 Bodily Harm, a 2002 TV mini-series by Joe Wright